Cumberland Island National Seashore preserves most of Cumberland Island in Camden County, Georgia, the largest of Georgia's Golden Isles.  The seashore features beaches and dunes, marshes, and freshwater lakes. The national seashore also preserves and interprets many historic sites and structures.

Instrumental in the creation and preservation of the seashore were several conservation organizations including the Sierra Club and the Georgia Conservancy.

The island is only accessible by boat.  The Cumberland Island Visitor Center, Cumberland Island Museum, and Lang concession ferry to the island are located in the town of St. Marys, Georgia.  Public access via the ferry is limited, reservations are recommended.  Camping is allowed in the seashore.  The  Cumberland Island Wilderness is part of the seashore.

History

The national seashore was authorized by Congress on October 23, 1972, and is administered by the National Park Service.  The wilderness area was designated on September 8, 1982.  It includes the High Point-Half Moon Bluff Historic District, which was listed on the National Register of Historic Places in 1978.

Biology and ecology

Cumberland Island National Seashore contains a dense diversity of coastal flora and fauna. The National Park Service employs a full-time wildlife manager and scientists, and hosts researchers periodically. The park contains at least 23 distinct ecological communities, making it the largest and most biodiverse of Georgia's barrier islands. Birds, particularly migratory waterfowl, have been studied.

Recreation
The public areas of Cumberland Island are part of a national seashore managed by the National Park Service. NPS restricts access to 300 people on the island at a time, and campers are allowed to stay no more than seven nights.  The island is only accessible by boat. The Cumberland Queen ferry runs three times a day from March 1 to September 30. From October 1 to November 31 it only runs twice a day. From December 1 to February 28 the boat runs twice a day only on Mondays - Thursdays to Cumberland Island from the mainland (St. Marys, Georgia). Visitors cannot bring vehicles on the ferry, and there are no paved roads or trails.  Bikes are available for rent at the Sea Camp Dock, on a first-come, first-served basis. Visitors may bring their own bikes on the ferry to the island for an additional charge. There is one camping area with running water and bathrooms with cold showers; the other camping sites do not have facilities. All food, ice and supplies must be shipped from the mainland, as there are no stores on the island.

Cumberland Island National Seashore Museum
The Cumberland Island National Seashore Museum is located in St. Marys, Georgia on the mainland entrance to the seashore, across from the park's visitor center.  The main exhibit focuses on the island's history, including displays on the Timucua Indians, antebellum plantations, and the estates of the Carnegie family. It includes information about the lives of American Revolutionary hero General Nathanael Greene and cotton-gin inventor Eli Whitney, the history of the ruined mansion Dungeness and the Plum Orchard estate. A secondary exhibit holds one of the finest transportation exhibits in coastal Georgia, including wagons, carriages, and elite travel equipment. The new exhibit "Forgotten Invasion" describes the occupation of Cumberland Island and Camden County during the War of 1812.  The museum is staffed by volunteers and is open on weekday afternoons.

Ice House Museum
The Ice House Museum was converted from one of the Carnegie service buildings. The museum showcases original artifacts and replicas from the island's prehistoric, colonial, early American and Gilded Era histories.

Plum Orchard and Dungeness 

The Dungeness and Plum Orchard were designated as National Historic Districts in 1982 and 1984 respectively. The Dungeness district contains the ruins of the Carnegie Dungeness mansion and its supporting structures and gardens, the Tabby House dating to the Early Republic, and a cemetery. The Plum Orchard Historic District contains the intact Plum Orchard mansion dating to the 1890s, a shell midden dating back over 4,000 years, and the mansion's support structures including an electrical house.

Climate

See also

 Grover Island
 Carol Ruckdeschel
 Georgia's Colonial Coast Birding Trail

References

 The National Parks: Index 2001–2003. Washington: U.S. Department of the Interior.

External links
 Official NPS website: Cumberland Island National Seashore
 Cumberland Island Wilderness
 World Database on Protected Areas: Cumberland Island NS

 
National Seashores of the United States
National Park Service areas in Georgia (U.S. state)
Museums in Camden County, Georgia
History museums in Georgia (U.S. state)
Protected areas of Camden County, Georgia
Protected areas established in 1972
1972 establishments in Georgia (U.S. state)